Samuel L. Smith was a school administrator and practical architect involved in school design for Rosenwald Schools.

Biography 
He had was born in Humphreys County, Tennessee, and was educated in a one-room schoolhouse.  He eventually graduated from Southwestern Presbyterian University in Clarksville, Tennessee, and earned a master's degree in rural school education from George Peabody College for Teachers.  Smith also studied at the University of Chicago and at Harvard.

Smith was a student of health education professor Fletcher B. Dresslar (1858–1930) who conducted an important initial survey for Rosenwald Schools. He was a rural school agent in Tennessee of the Rosenwald School program, then General Field Agent.

He created a series of school plans, for one-teacher, one-room and other sized schools, in various orientations suited for the weather and light of rural schools in the U.S. south.  These designs were issued in a booklet entitled Community School Plans, which also included contractor specifications and other guidance.

Works 
Numerous works associated with him survive and are listed on the U.S. National Register of Historic Places. Works credited to him include (with variants in attribution as indicated in National Register listing):
Allen-White School, 100 Allen Extension St. Whiteville, TN (Smith, Samuel L.)
Bigelow Rosenwald School, Jct. of AR 60 and Bethel AME Rd. Toad Suck, AR (Smith, Samuel L.)
DeLeon Springs Colored School, 330 E. Retta St. DeLeon Springs, FL (Smith, Samuel L.)
Dunbar Public School, 113 Steekee St. Loudon, TN (Smith, Samuel L.)
Durham's Chapel School, 5055 Old TN 31E Bethpage, TN (Smith, Samuel L.)
Eleanor Roosevelt School, Parham St. at Leverette Hill Rd. Warm Springs, GA (Smith, Samuel L.)
Free Hills Rosenwald School, Free Hills Rd., E of TN 52 Free Hill, TN (Smith, Samuel L.)
Hope Rosenwald School, 1971 Hope Station Rd. Pomaria, SC (Smith, Samuel L.)
Hopewell Rosenwald School, Adjacent to 253 Hopewell Church Road (SC Sec RD 33–12) Clarks Hill, SC (Smith, Samuel L.)
Lafayette County Training School, 1046 Berry St. Stamps, AR (Smith, Samuel L.)
Lincoln School, Old TN 28 near Rockford Rd. Pikeville, TN (Smith, Samuel)
Merritt School, Old Troy Rd., 0.5 mi. S of US 82 Midway, AL (Smith, Samuel)
Oak Grove School, 0.25 mi. W of AL 69, 1 mi. N of jct. of AL 69 and US-80 Prairieville, AL (Smith, Samuel)
Orange City Colored School, 200 E. Blue Springs Ave. Orange City, FL (Smith, Samuel L.)
Ridge Hill High School, 206 Ridge Hill Dr Ridge Spring, SC (Smith, Samuel L.)
Selma Rosenwald School, Selma—Collins Rd., approx. 0.25 mi. S of US 278 Selma, AR (Smith, Samuel)
Tankersley Rosenwald School, 10 mi. S. on Montgomery on US 31 to Pettus Rd. to School Spur on W. side Hope Hull, AL (Smith, Samuel L.)
Wells School, 4140 Collierville—Arlington Rd. Eads, TN (Smith, Samuel)

References

American architects
People from Humphreys County, Tennessee
Architects from Tennessee
School administrators